The nForce2 chipset was released by Nvidia in July 2002 as a refresh to the original nForce product offering. The nForce2 chipset was a platform for motherboards supporting AMD's Socket A CPUs along with DDR SDRAM. There were multiple variations of the chipset including one with an integrated GeForce4 MX graphics processor (IGP), and one without.

Development

The nForce2 features two different southbridges, the MCP and the MCP-T. The two differ only in audio and Ethernet integration. The latter is equipped with two 100 Mbit Ethernet NICs (nV and 3Com 3C905) and the NVAPU (SoundStorm) with hardware accelerated 3D audio and real-time 5.1-channel Dolby Digital encoding, whereas the first features one 100 Mbit NIC and an AC'97 audio controller. For audio, both MCP units were connected to an external codec chip, such as a Realtek ALC650. With the MCP, this codec provided all software-driven audio duties, while with the MCP-T it performed the DAC duties. Unfortunately, the external codec and unavoidably noisy motherboard circuitry (EMI/RFI) were detrimental to audio quality on even the MCP-T equipped boards. As a result, the nForce audio solutions were never of high fidelity unless the S/PDIF output (TOSLINK or coaxial) was used.

The nForce2 chipset was noteworthy for its advanced memory controller. It introduced a dual-channel memory interface to the mainstream market, doubling theoretical bandwidth. This was deemed necessary for the nForce2 IGP, with its GeForce4 MX-class integrated graphics, to be performance competitive budget solution. It was also important not to divert bandwidth, by sharing memory bandwidth with the most powerful IGP produced for Socket A, from the rest of the system. The Athlon XP's front-side bus capped out at 400 mhz, which was only enough to handle the memory bandwidth provided by dual-channel DDR-200 or single-channel DDR-400. As a result, one memory channel was reserved for the CPU while the other was almost exclusively available for the GPU. In dual-channel configurations of the nForce2 without IGP, the Athlon XP only showed gains of 5% at most in memory bandwidth intensive applications. Comparatively, in dual-channel configurations with IGP graphics, performance was demonstrably equivalent to dedicated GeForce 2 MX cards employing 64bit DDR memory or 128bit SDR memory.

Among various fixes and refinements compared to the original nForce, nForce2 featured a fixed PCI/AGP clock, i.e. PCI and AGP frequencies will not change when changing the FSB. As a result, the nForce2 platform was known for its ease in overclocking AMD processors, and was used frequently in the overclocking community for a few years. It was also known that the chipset gave best performance with FSB and memory running synchronized, asynchronous operation delivered an unusual high performance loss.

Refresh
In 2003, Nvidia released a refreshed nForce2, called "nForce2 Ultra 400". The nForce2 Ultra 400 and nForce2 400 represented official support for a 200 MHz FSB and PC-3200 DDR SDRAM, whereas the older nForce2 had only supported a maximum of 166 MHz FSB. Ultra 400 offered dual-channel support, while the plain 400 was single-channel PC-3200-capable. Both performed very similarly because neither had the IGP and again Athlon XP did not benefit significantly from the added bandwidth because the Athlon XP's bus was only capable of bandwidth matching a single channel of PC-3200. The new chipset again was partnered with several different southbridges, including one with (MCP-T) and one without (MCP) SoundStorm and dual Ethernet NICs. In 2004 three new  southbridges were introduced: MCP-S integrated Serial ATA, MCP-RAID had additional RAID-functions and MCP-Gb featured Gigabit Ethernet. These newer southbridges did not integrate the SoundStorm unit nor the dual-Ethernet capabilities of the MCP-T.

SoundStorm

The SoundStorm audio system was one of the first consumer computer audio products to offer real time Dolby Digital 5.1 encoding. This meant that one could play games or music and output them as a 5.1 stream digitally to an external decoding speaker system. This solves a common problem with most digital sound solutions of having to hook up both digital and analog connections at the same time so you can have surround sound in both games (using the analog connections) and movies (using the digital connection). Only recently has Dolby Digital live allowed competitors such as Creative's x-fi line up to offer real time DD 5.1 encoding.

Some see the passing of SoundStorm as a classic example of the bottom dollar approach to building computers sweeping the PC industry, with component quality being gradually eroded, in favor of pricing considerations. SoundStorm was good competition for Creative Labs during its time, but did suffer from driver issues and performance problems. Many computer owners also had their own discrete audio solutions, such as the popular Creative Audigy series, the VIA Envy24, or various Turtle Beach boards, among other high end solutions offering superior analog quality. This made the NVAPU/SoundStorm a niche product in a market where keeping board costs low is essential to sales volume.

SoundStorm/NVAPU's existence was a direct result of Xbox development, with the APU being directly related to the technology used in Microsoft's console, (which incorporated Sensaura's HRTF 3D audio technology).  As the technology aged and consumers and OEMs showed a lack of interest in purchasing the more expensive but higher quality chipsets, Nvidia did not see reason to justify further R&D expenditures.

See also
 Comparison of Nvidia chipsets

References

External links 
 Nvidia: nForce2
 NVIDIA nForce Platform Processors
 Anandtech: Nvidia nForce2 Preview
 Anandtech: Nvidia's nForce2 Performance Review
 Anandtech: Nvidia's nForce2 Part II: Diving Deeper

Nvidia chipsets